Isograptus is an extinct genus of graptolites from the Ordovician.

References

 Dinosaurs to Dodos: An Encyclopedia of Extinct Animals by Don Lessem and Jan Sovak

Graptolite genera
Paleozoic life of British Columbia
Paleozoic life of Newfoundland and Labrador
Paleozoic life of the Northwest Territories
Paleozoic life of Yukon